Events in the year 1826 in Art.

Events
 December 25 – Opening of the Military Gallery of the Winter Palace, containing 332 portraits of generals who took part in the Patriotic War of 1812, painted by George Dawe and his Russian assistants Alexander Polyakov and Wilhelm August Golicke.
 Samuel Palmer moves to Shoreham, Kent, where he stays for the next decade.

Works

 Thomas Cole – Sunrise in the Catskill Mountains
 John Constable – The Cornfield
 Jean-Baptiste-Camille Corot – The Bridge at Narni
 Eugène Delacroix – 
The Execution of the Doge Marino Faliero (completed)
Greece on the Ruins of Missolonghi
 William Etty – The Judgement of Paris
 Francesco Hayez - Lampugnani's Conspiracy
 Orest Kiprensky
 Portrait of Prince N. P. Trubetzkoy
 Portrait of O. A. Ryumina
 Nicéphore Niépce – View from the Window at Le Gras, the first permanent photograph of a natural subject
 James Northcote – A Moor
 Joseph Denis Odevaere – Lord Byron on his Death-bed (Groeningemuseum)
 Samuel Palmer – Self-portrait
 Horace Vernet – Battle of the Bridge of Arcole
 Henry Voordecker – Hunter's Home

Births
February 18 – Lea Ahlborn, Swedish engraver (died 1897)
March – Serafino De Tivoli, Italian painter (died 1892)
 March 6 – Annie Feray Mutrie, British painter (died 1893)
March 25 – Wilhelmina Lagerholm, Swedish photographer (died 1917)
April 6 – Gustave Moreau, French Symbolist painter (died 1898)
May 2 – Eleuterio Pagliano, Italian Romantic painter (died 1903)
May 4 – Frederick Edwin Church, American landscape painter (died 1900)
May 11 – Ludovic Piette, French impressionist painter (died 1878)
June 8 – Thomas Faed, Scottish genre painter (died 1900)
September 24 – George Price Boyce, English Pre-Raphaelite watercolour landscape painter (died 1897)
October 1 – Karl von Piloty, German painter (died 1886)
November 11 – Elise Arnberg, Swedish miniaturist and photographer (died 1891) 
December 8 – Silvestro Lega, Italian painter (died 1895)
 date unknown
Novak Radonić, Serbian painter (died 1890)
 Madame Virot, French fashion designer (died 1911)

Deaths
January 25 – Joseph Boze, French portrait and miniature painter (born 1746)
February 21 – John Kay, Scottish caricaturist (born 1750)
March 5 – Charles Paul Landon, French painter and writer on art and artists (born 1760)
March 17 – Ferdinand Bauer, Austrian botanical illustrator (born 1760)
July 23 – Marie-Élisabeth Laville-Leroux, French painter (born 1770)
October 8
Marie-Guillemine Benoist, French neoclassical, historical and genre painter (born 1768)
George Garrard, English artist (born 1760)
November 12 – Christian Gullager, Danish artist specializing in portraits and theatrical scenery (born 1759)
November 26 – John Nichols, English printer and author (born 1745)
December 7 – John Flaxman, English sculptor (born 1755)
 date unknown
 Thomas Foster, Irish portrait painter (born 1798; suicide)
 Jean-Louis Laneuville, French portrait painter (born 1748)
 Andrey Yefimovich Martynov, Russian painter and engraver (born 1768)
 Victor-Jean Nicolle, French landscape and architecture painter (born 1754)
 Mustafa Râkim, Ottoman calligrapher (born 1757)
 Peter Edward Stroehling, portrait artist from either Germany or the Russian Empire (born 1768)

References

 
Years of the 19th century in art
1820s in art